The Chocolatería San Ginés is a café at Pasadizo de San Ginés, 5, in central Madrid, in a passageway close to San Ginés church, west of the Puerta del Sol.  It has served principally chocolate con churros (hot chocolate and churros) since 1894.  Coffee and cakes are also available.

The interior is decorated with mirrors and green wood panels, with green velvet seats and marble tables.  The hot chocolate is served in Spanish style - thick, dark and strong - and the churros - deep fried batter, similar to a light, crispy, linear doughnut, cut to length by the staff - are served hot and freshly cooked, ready for dunking.

In 2010, a San Ginés's branch was opened in Shibuya, Tokyo (Japan). It closed one year later, in 2011.

References

External links

venere travel blog
Europe for Visitors
Notes from Madrid
 In Spanish

1894 establishments in Spain
Buildings and structures in Sol neighborhood, Madrid
Coffeehouses and cafés in Spain
Food and drink companies based in Madrid